Ata is a nearly extinct Philippine Negrito language spoken in Negros Island in the Visayas region of the Philippines.

As of 2013, Ata was reportedly spoken by no more than three or four elderly individuals in northern Negros Island, Philippines, although two of those died in 2021.

Notes

References

 

Central Philippine languages
Endangered Austronesian languages
Languages of Negros Oriental